Glenea sanctaemariae is a species of beetle in the family Cerambycidae that lives in Bangladesh and India. It was described by James Thomson in 1857.

References

sanctaemariae
Beetles described in 1857